Dragon Ball Z (originally published in Japan as Dragon Ball chapters 195–519) is the English title for the last two thirds of the Dragon Ball manga, which was written and illustrated by Akira Toriyama. The story follows Son Goku as he discovers that he comes from the extraterrestrial Saiyan warrior race and faces powerful enemies who threaten the inhabitants of earth and the wider universe.
 
The original series was issued in the magazine Weekly Shōnen Jump. The individual chapters were collected by Shueisha in a series of 42 tankōbon volumes; The first tankōbon was released on September 10, 1985, while the last one was released on August 4, 1995. In 2002, the manga was re-released in a collection of 34 kanzenban, which included a slightly rewritten ending, new covers, and color artwork from its Weekly Shōnen Jump run. There have also been two anime adaptations, both produced by Toei Animation. The first, also named Dragon Ball, adapted the first sixteen volumes of the Japanese manga and the second, Dragon Ball Z, adapted the remaining twenty-six volumes.

The distribution company Viz Media has released all 42 volumes in English in the United States, with volumes seventeen through forty-two renamed "Dragon Ball Z" volumes one through twenty-six. Both "series" were published since March 1998 (with a re-release of the first ten volumes in 2003); the last volume of the second part was released on June 6, 2006. The first 134 chapters of "Dragon Ball Z" were also released across individual comic books, chapters 135-226 made their North American debuts in Shonen Jump magazine, while chapters 227-325 were released exclusively in the graphic novel format. In June 2008, Viz began re-releasing both "series" in a wideban format called "Viz Big Edition", which is a collection of three volumes in one. On November 4, 2008, a "Collector's Edition" of volume one with a hardback was made available. In February 2013, Viz began serializing a fully colored version of the manga in their digital anthology Weekly Shonen Jump, under the title Dragon Ball (Full Color).



Volume list

Notes

References

Z Chapters